Freeview is New Zealand's free-to-air television platform. It is operated by a joint venture between the country's major free-to-air broadcasters – government-owned Television New Zealand and Radio New Zealand, government-subsidised Whakaata Māori, and the American-owned Warner Bros. Discovery (operators of Three, Bravo, Eden and Rush). 

It consists of a HD-capable digital terrestrial television service to around 86% of the population in the major urban and provincial centres of New Zealand, and a standard-definition satellite television service, covering the whole of mainland New Zealand and the major offshore islands. Freeview uses the DVB-S and DVB-T standards on government-provided spectrum. 

Additionally, an IPTV service is provided via the Freeview Streaming TV app, available on a range of smart TVs and Android TV devices.

Freeview was launched in May 2007, preparing for analogue switch-off, which began on 30 September 2012 and was completed on 1 December 2013. In 2014, it was estimated that Freeview made up approximately 61.7% of the television share in New Zealand.

Freeview-certified set-top boxes and IDTVs, as well as PVRs, are available at most major retailers. Uncertified equipment can also be used to receive the service, which may have advantages (cheaper, extra features, international channels) and disadvantages (no/limited EPG, no auto-retuning) over certified equipment.

History 

It was announced on 15 June 2006 that Freeview's digital television would broadcast via satellite (DVB-S) from mid-2007 and via terrestrial transmissions (DVB-T) from mid-2008. Freeview's marketing campaign began on 23 April 2007 through a website and through four television advertisements shown on Freeview's shareholders' TV channels, using the slogan "Make bad reception a thing of the past", and showing people using proverbial substitutes for rabbit ears for receiving TV reception. Since 2012, Māori comedian Pio Terei has been the advertising face of Freeview.

Freeview's satellite service began on 2 May 2007 with five television channels: TV One, TV2, TV3, C4, and Māori Television. Freeview's first digital-only channel, TVNZ Sport Extra temporary channel from TVNZ, began on 18 May 2007, providing coverage of the V8 Supercar racing. The channel has since ceased broadcasting.

The Freeview terrestrial service, originally named "Freeview|HD", officially launched on 14 April 2008. The service initially operated only from Kordia sites for areas surrounding Auckland, Hamilton, Tauranga, Napier-Hastings, Palmerston North, Wellington, Christchurch, and Dunedin.  JDA sites were upgraded later with DVB-T QAM modulating multiplexers for non-metro areas.

An IPTV streaming app, Freeview Streaming TV was launched in 2019 by Dish TV. This app was originally locked to devices sold by Dish TV only. From 12 December 2022, the app was made available for many smart TVs running the Android TV operating system, as well as some LG, Samsung and Panasonic TV's running a proprietary operating system.

Services

Virtual channels
The Freeview ordering groups broadcasters by how much they pay for government owned Kordia transmission services.

Higher viewership nationwide

 original nationwide (that were analogue simulcast):
 TVNZ 1 (4 regions, selected HD, timeshifted, government-owned)
 TVNZ 2 (selected HD, timeshifted, government-owned)
 Three (selected HD, timeshifted)
 Bravo (timeshifted and Sky transponder on satellite) 
 Whakaata Māori (government subsidised, selected HD)
 Prime (selected HD, timeshifted and Sky transponder on satellite)

 Digital only:
 TVNZ Duke (selected HD, timeshifted)
 Eden (selected HD, timeshifted)
 Rush (selected HD)
 Te Reo (government subsidised)
 Al Jazeera
 HGTV

Lower viewership nationwide

 JDA local terrestrial site only:
 Shine TV (satellite and Nelson Takaka/Observatory Hill sites)
 All Kordia and JDA national sites:
 Firstlight TV (terrestrial only)
 CH200 (terrestrial only)

 Kordia metro terrestrial sites:
 Parliament TV (with satellite coverage and government subsidised)
 TV28
 Channel 33

Locally inserted terrestrial only

 Kordia local terrestrial site only:
 Apna Television (Auckland)
 Channel 39 (Dunedin)

 JDA local terrestrial site only:
 Television Hawke's Bay (Hawke's Bay)
Wairarapa TV (Wairarapa)

Higher priority nationwide radio
 Satellite and Kordia terrestrial sites only
 Radio New Zealand National (government subsidised)
 Radio New Zealand Concert (government subsidised)

Lower priority nationwide radio
 George FM (satellite only)
 Base FM (satellite and Kordia terrestrial sites only)
 NiuFM (satellite only via non-certified FTA receiver)

Local independent non-Freeview terrestrial only

 Auckland Sky Tower JDA site:
 SCTV  (Korean Christian)
 V1 (Korean movies)
 V2 – YTN (Korean commercial news)
 K-POP (Korean music videos)
 V4 - CNC  (Chinese state news in English)
 V5 - NHK World (Japanese state news and documentaries in English)
 V6 – Arirang TV  (Korean documentaries in English)
 V7 - Zee TV (Indian entertainment)
 V8 - Republic TV (Indian commercial news)

 Mainland TV 1 and 2 (previously simulcast on analogue)
 local news (looped video)
 VOA (rebroadcast)
 VOA Music Mix (rebroadcast)
 45 South TV for Oamaru from Cape Wanbrow owned site @ 34 (578 MHz)

MHEG Interaction Channel
MHEG-IC channels are from LCN 200 to 299. From 2011 it is mandatory for all TVs over 32inch and PVRs to include IP based MHEG Interaction Channel. It's optional on receivers to ensure that a lower cost option is available as New Zealand heads towards DSO.

In October 2014, Worldnet TV launched the first commercial MHEG-IC channel in New Zealand and was added to JDA regional sites as an MHEG-IC application on LCN 250 which includes seven live streams. As of 29 October 2014, live channels include NHK World, Arirang TV, MBC, Yonhap, MBN, HiTV+ and BTN.

Metadata
Freeview has its own eight-day electronic programme guide (EPG), named Freeview EPG; TVNZ's Teletext service was also available until it was discontinued in April 2013. The EPG via the satellite service provides an eight-day schedule with programme details on both a traditional EIT and MHEG-5 application, whereas the EPG via the terrestrial service has limited programme details via the traditional EIT with full details available only via the MHEG-5 application.

For all certified NZ Freeview (also all Australian "Freeview EPG" branded) receivers to activate the MHEG-5 EPG, the receiver must remap the remote control's guide button to be an extended function key for use by MHEG-5 applications which are normally limited to the four coloured buttons for launching functions.  This is more common on terrestrial than on satellite due to the differences in launch dates.  Receivers that do this make the traditional EIT function useless, which is why independent local broadcasters (such as the Hawke's Bay's TVHB) have to pay Freeview to include their scheduling details within the Freeview guide.   Broadcasters within the UK do not have this problem as they only use the traditional EIT with MHEG-5's use limited to interactive services such as the Red Button Teletext replacement and internet streaming services.

During the third week of December 2014, TVNZ tested using the same Huffman look-up tables the BBC implemented to force viewers to use approved Freeview receivers that restrict HD recording and viewing.  The Huffman tables are being used to compress the EIT text used for terrestrial schedule event names and descriptions.  From March 2015, TVNZ began compressing the EIT schedule again. Compressing the EIT text in the schedule would not achieve the same receiver use given the terrestrial EIT only has limited programme details.  Receivers that don't use the BBC huffman tables will either display no details or display garbage characters.

The assigned identifiers managed by TVNZ and Kordia on behalf of Freeview are as follows:

H.222 Program IDs (aka Service IDs)
 10xx - TVNZ provided satellite channels
 12xx - TVNZ provided terrestrial channels
 13xx - Warner Bros. Discovery provided terrestrial channels
 14xx - Kordia/JDA provided terrestrial channels
 15xx - Kordia provided terrestrial channels
 16xx - independently provided terrestrial channels
 19xx - All other provided satellite channels
 41xx - Sky Network Television provided terrestrial channels
H.222 Transport IDs
 21 for the Warner Bros. Discovery leased satellite service
 22 for the TVNZ leased satellite service
 23 - 24 are reserved for future operated satellite services
 25 for the TVNZ operated Auckland terrestrial service
 26 for the TVNZ operated Waikato/Bay of Plenty terrestrial service
 27 for the TVNZ operated Wellington terrestrial service
 28 for the TVNZ operated South Island terrestrial service
 29 for the Warner Bros. Discovery operated Auckland terrestrial service
 30 for the Warner Bros. Discovery operated Waikato/Bay of Plenty terrestrial service
 31 for the Warner Bros. Discovery operated Wellington terrestrial service
 32 for the Warner Bros. Discovery operated South Island terrestrial service
 33 for the Kordia metro (K1) and JDA (J1) regional operated terrestrial service
 34 for the Kordia only (K2) operated terrestrial service
 35 - 36 are reserved for future Kordia operated terrestrial services
 38 for an independently operated terrestrial service
 65 for the Sky Network Television operated terrestrial service
DVB Transmission Network ID for the Freeview terrestrial service is 13313.

DVB Original (content) Network ID for the terrestrial service is 8746.

DVB Transmission and Original (content) Network ID for the satellite service is 47 and registered to TVNZ.

DVB Transmission and Original (content) Network ID for the Igloo terrestrial service is 11008 and registered to Sky.

DVB-T Cell ID used by the Kordia operated terrestrial service for filtering channels by transmitter site:

This is a five digit number with the first digit identifying the transport provider, the second digit identifies the multiplexed transport, the third digit identifies the region with the final two specifying the region's transmitter site.

Provider
 TVNZ
 Warner Bros. Discovery
 Kordia
 6 - Independent

Regions
 Upper North Island
 Waikato/Bay of Plenty
 Hawke's Bay
 Taranaki/Manawatu
 Lower North Island
 Upper South Island
 Lower South Island

Transmitter Site
 00 - Kordia primary
 01 - 04 - Kordia infill
 05 - Independent
 10/20/40/50 - JDA primary
 11 - JDA infill
 30 - Kordia Lower North Island secondary

Distribution
 the Freeview platform has 30 television channels and 4 radio stations.

For the satellite service (up-linked from the Avalon studios in Lower Hutt), up to 18 channels will be available, with six each assigned to TVNZ and Warner Bros. Discovery frequencies, and the balance to other networks.

Defunct channels 
Services (taken from AsiaSat 3S @ 105 east) that were available before the Freeview launch on satellite were Zing channels ZEE TV, Cinema, News and Punjabi, BHARAT TV, Al Jazeera Arabic and English channels, DWTV, TV5 and VOA.

The Freeview|HD Demo terrestrial channel 100 was removed to free up space for various SD channels.

The TVNZ Sport Extra channel 20 was temporarily provided for the 2008 Olympics, the space on DVB-S was later used by a regional version of TV One.

The Auckland-based STRATOS channel 21 was discontinued due to service fee increases that occurred when its ratings increased, it was later replaced by ChoiceTV.  STRATOS later reemerged on pay TV under the name Face TV.

TVNZ 6 and 7 were discontinued due to the government-provided funding coming to an end and were respectively, replaced by U and an hour delay of TV One. TVNZ U was replaced by an hour delay of TV2 in 2013.

Trackside became a pay TV-only channel on 14 April 2014 as a measure to raise more revenue for increased services for New Zealand Racing Board customers.

C4 closed down on 26 June 2014 to free space for a time-shifted version of FOUR.

The following channels were closed down due to being unable to meet transmission costs:  Sommet Sports on 12 December 2014, Cue on 10 April 2015, and tvCentral (Hamilton and Tauranga) and TV Rotorua both on 30 April 2015.

TV29, also known as Panda Channel 29, was closed by Best News Entertainment on 1 October 2021.

Breeze TV and sister channel The Edge TV, were both closed on 22 March 2022.

Other broadcasters 
Freeview will be open to other free-to-air broadcasters if they want to join.

According to Kordia there is space for approximately only 20 channels on the two satellite transponders that Freeview leases . However at 22.5 MBd with a FEC of 3/4 one 23 MHz frequency can only accommodate either six SD 4:3 H.262 QPSK channels or four HD 16:9 H.264 8PSK channels while maintaining an optimal bit rate.

Quality 

Satellite transmissions are broadcast in 576i, but the satellite transponder is high-definition capable.
Terrestrial transmissions can be broadcast in high definition, and the government lets the broadcasters decide whether to broadcast in high definition or to continue in standard definition.

Six channels currently broadcast in high definition: TVNZ 1, TVNZ 2, TVNZ DUKE, Three, Whakaata Māori and Te Reo in 1080i.

Freeview satellite broadcasts have declined in quality since the service launched as TV ONE and TV3 are now being broadcast many times to provide region-specific advertisements; this reduces the bandwidth available to other channels on that frequency. From July 2016, Mediaworks deregionalised TV3 so that it uses 1 SD channel alongside its HD channel.

The TVNZ frequency currently has 8 SD channels while the Discovery New Zealand frequency has 12 TV channels and 5 radio channels.

Technology 

UHF terrestrial broadcasting using DVB-T H.264 (also known as DVB-T HD), and currently covers 86 percent of the country's population. Only three towns with a population over 10,000 do not have terrestrial service: Queenstown (pop. ), Blenheim (pop. ) and Whakatāne (pop. ). In addition, Oamaru (pop. ) has limited terrestrial service through local station 45 South TV, while coverage of Cambridge (pop. ) is intermittent as hills partially block the signal from Te Aroha transmitter and Hamilton Towers transmitter is not powerful enough (63 watts) to reach the town. Freeview's terrestrial transmissions are broadcast from Kordia's and JDA's transmitter towers.

Freeview uses the DVB-T ODFM standard for terrestrial transmission, as established in 2001 with NZS6610:2001, to avoid the multipath problem caused by New Zealand's rugged topography. ATSC, the rival US standard that uses 8-VSB modulation, had a number of first gen. demodulators that couldn't handle multipath well, so it was not chosen.

Terrestrial Freeview is broadcast in H.264, which unlike H.262 has an expensive transmission patent licensing tax for free TV and subscription use. People who took part in the Auckland digital trial using terrestrial H.262 receivers needed to change their receivers to more expensive H.264 models in order to receive terrestrial Freeview. DVB-T H.264 is also known in other countries as DVB-T HD, due to H.262 being used for SD. Currently the government owned TVNZ and Kordia which operate the H.264 re-compression multiplexers are failing to fully meet the in Good Standing payments to be included in the licensees listing.  MHEG-5 is used for the electronic programming guide.

MHEG-5 support is built by the UK's Strategy and Technology who provided the similar applications for the BBC's Red Button and terrestrial internet streaming platform.

Freeview Satellite uses the Optus D1 satellite to broadcast, on two transponders, leased from Kordia. The satellite transmissions utilise H.262 video. Freeview cannot easily move to H.264 video broadcasting in the future as the encoding is unsupported by a large number of the receivers in the Freeview Satellite install base, also the additional patent licensing tax would make the satellite service even more expensive for channel operators. Unlike the terrestrial service, the satellite service broadcasts a more useful traditional DVB EPG alongside the functionally limited MHEG-5 EPG.

Freeview had discussed with Telecom about the provision of IPTV over ADSL until it was shelved due to bandwidth and availability limitations.

Certification 
Freeview certifies set-top boxes but does not sell them; they are marketed by electronics retailers. Freeview certification centres the localisation of multimedia data, primarily for the electronic programming guide (EPG).  This data is broadcast over DVB using the MHEG-5 standard. At the moment this is only used to transmit EPG data.

Freeview Record certification of digital video recorders is similar to Freeview certification, but also includes dual tuner with smart conflict resolution including alternate recordings of repeat programmes and one touch series recording from the EPG. Full fast forward and rewind cuing is available while an automatic ad skip function is not allowed. For copyrighted HD content, only devices that comply with studio DTCP are allowed to externally transfer content while all SD content is transferable. There are no time limits on content playback. As of May 2012, there are currently two certified MyFreeview Satellite receivers available, which are from the New Zealand-based Dish TV company.

MHEG-5 is used exclusively for a full 8-day terrestrial broadcast schedule as Freeview do not fully populate the DVB EIT EPG, this means there are few uncertified terrestrial receivers on the market able to run the MHEG-5 Freeview EPG application. An uncertified terrestrial DVR would have to know the specific files to extract from the DSM-CC stream to support a full EPG.

Freeview certification requires set-top boxes to disallow high definition video output over connections that do not support HDCP. In practice this means nearly all HD CRT televisions sold in New Zealand and many early flat screen televisions can only receive high definition from an uncertified set-top box, which can output high definition over HDCP-free connections like component cables or on HDMI without HDCP.

Digital TV Labs is an officially approved test centre for Freeview New Zealand conformance testing, where manufacturers wishing to deploy devices with the associated Freeview  New Zealand logos and access to the Freeview EPG can obtain pass reports.

There are also many non-certified options are available.  These and other FTA receivers have no limit on advert skipping nor restrict access to the recorded files or prevent streaming of recordings to other devices, Ultraplus X-9200HD PVR, Vu+ Duo, Xcruiser XDSR385HD PVR are all examples of units that are or have been sold in NZ and have all of this capability. They can also receive any other available non-freeview channel.

Terrestrial transmitters

Kordia and Johnson Dick and Associates (JDA) maintain a terrestrial network of 64-QAM and 256-QAM capable transmitters around New Zealand.

Kordia-owned sites are on mostly Crown-owned DOC land and provide television and radio digital services to only Freeview and Igloo, whereas JDA-equipped sites are only on commercial land.  Shared sites (such as Auckland's Sky Tower) have the advantage of not requiring a separate antenna - unlike Nelson's Mainland TV, which is located between sites. In the Wairarapa and Southland, JDA's Popoiti and Forest Hill transmitters were used rather than Kordia's Otahoua and Hedgehope transmitters, which had previously been used for UHF transmitters, necessitating viewers in these regions to rotate their outdoor antennas.

Polarisation (i.e., antenna orientation) is either horizontal/flat (H) or vertical/tall (V). A high-power site has a licensed broadcasting power of 10,000 watts or greater; a medium-power site has a licensed broadcasting power of between 500 and 10,000 watts; and a low-power site has a licensed broadcasting power of less than 500 watts.

High-power sites (all except the last operated by Kordia):
 Waiatarua (H) for the Auckland metropolitan area (including Pukekohe)
 Te Aroha (H) for the Waikato and parts of Tauranga
 Mount Erin (V) for Hawke's Bay
 Mount Taranaki (H) for Taranaki
 Wharite (V) for the Manawatu
 Kaukau for the Wellington (H) metropolitan area
 Sugarloaf (H) for Christchurch
 Mount Cargill (H) for Dunedin
 Forest Hill (V) for Invercargill

Medium-power sites run by Kordia:
 Waiheke Island Airstrip (V) for Waiheke Island
 Kopukairua (V) for Tauranga
 Ngarara (V) for Kapiti
 Fitzherbert (V) for Lower Hutt and Wainuiomata

Medium-power sites run by JDA:
 Parihaka (V) for Whangārei
 Sky Tower (V) for Auckland
 Pukepoto (V) for Rotorua
 Whakaroa (V) for Taupō
 Parikanapa (H) and Wheatstone Road (H) for Gisborne
 Popoiti (H) for the Wairarapa
 Mount Campbell (V) and Botanical Ridge (H) for Nelson
 Cave Hill (V) for Timaru

Low-power sites (all except the last  operated by Kordia):
 Pinehill (H) for Auckland's North Shore,
 Remuera (V) for the Remuera area
 Hamilton Towers (V) for Hamilton city
 Napier Airport (V) for northern Napier
 Mount Jowett (H) for Whanganui
 Baxters Knob (H) for Porirua and Tawa
 Haywards (V) for the Hutt Valley

Finance 
Freeview is the second digital TV system attempted by the government. The first, in 2000, cost NZ$6.8 million.

The government will pay up to NZ$25 million and provide free radio spectrum, estimated to be worth up to NZ$10 million during the transition to digital; the companies involved will pay the remaining $50 million. Canterbury TV estimates it will need to pay NZ$1 million a year if it joins Freeview. The government claims a NZ$230 million benefit to the economy.

Competition 
Sky had a decoder rental package where free-to-air channels similar to the ones available on Freeview were available for a low monthly fee. In 2006, around 90,000 people used this service, generally those who couldn't get a high quality signal from analogue terrestrial television. Sky has been relatively unaffected by the launch of Freeview. Because both services use Optus D1, a Sky dish can be used to receive Freeview, but a separate set-top box is required.

See also 
 Television in New Zealand
 List of free-to-air channels in New Zealand
 Digital changeover dates in New Zealand
 Lounge TV

Notes

References

External links 

 Freeview
 Google map showing NZ TV transmitter locations
 Transmitter channel numbers and muxes
 TVNZ digital TV site
 Ministry of Economic Development on digital TV
 Technical details

 Media coverage
 TVNZ News
 Unlimited
 Bloomberg

 Equipment suppliers
 OpenMedia
 Satellite and Terrestrial Equipment Supplier
 AV1 equipment supplier

Digital television
Television in New Zealand
2007 in New Zealand television
New Zealand companies established in 2007